Hard Spell Abbey is a five-part spelling bee game show produced for CBBC. It was shot entirely on location in Suffolk during 2004. The series was designed to accompany Hard Spell, a family spelling competition for BBC One. Each episode featured games as well as some reality-based filming. Short comedy cameos from spelling celebrities were included in a popular strand named "Spellebrity Squares". In this rehash of a popular classic, celebrities (including Dermot O'Leary, Dick and Dom, Tracy Beaker, Jonathan Ross, and Dermot Murnaghan) were asked to spell live on camera.

In the show Simon Hickson played Brother Brendan, a slightly mad but likeable monk who lived at the abbey and wanted to be involved with every game. Jaz Ampaw-Farr, international education consultant and TEDx Speaker was the spelling expert who coached the contestants, aided by Brother Brendan to spelling success.

External links
Hard Spell Abbey

2004 British television series debuts
2004 British television series endings
BBC television game shows
BBC children's television shows
Spelling competitions